Allonectella is a genus of ascomycete fungi in the family Nectriaceae.

External links
 

Nectriaceae genera